The following is a detailed discography for American rock music singer-songwriter Lisa Loeb, including her work as Lisa Loeb & Nine Stories. Loeb has released a total of 15 studio albums, 1 compilation album, and 2 EPs. She has also released over 30 singles.

In the beginning of her career, Loeb began as a young singer-songwriter with friend, Elizabeth Mitchell, with whom she recorded two albums. In 1994, her self-penned song, "Stay (I Missed You)" was featured in the soundtrack of Reality Bites, after which it gained widespread airplay on radio. The song reached #1 on the Billboard Hot 100, and also reached the Top 10 on both the Hot Adult Contemporary Tracks and Modern Rock Tracks charts. She released her first major label studio album the following year with Tails, and had continued success in the United States, along with her third studio album, Firecracker.

Loeb began the new millennium focused on children's music and has since recorded several albums in the genre, including Camp Lisa. 2013 saw the return of adult material with the release of studio album No Fairy Tale. Loeb returned again to children's albums with Nursery Rhyme Parade!, which was made available on October 16, 2015.

Albums

Studio albums

Children's albums

Compilation albums

With Liz and Lisa

EPs

Singles

As lead artist

As featured artist

Music videos

References

External links
 

Rock music discographies
Pop music discographies
Discography
Discographies of American artists